A Burnt Offering for the Bone Idol is the second album by British folk metal band Skyclad, released in 1992.

Track listing 
Source: Metal Archives 
All music by Steve Ramsey, All lyrics by Martin Walkyier.

The samples in War and Disorder have been compiled by Kevin Ridley.

References 

1992 albums
Skyclad (band) albums
Noise Records albums
Albums produced by Kevin Ridley